On an island like Iceland, the rivers are short in length. None of the rivers are important as a means of navigation due to the impracticality of settlements in the Highlands of Iceland where they originate.

South
Hvítá
Krossá
Kúðafljót
Markarfljót
Mustafl
Ölfusá (the Icelandic river with the greatest flow)
Rangá 
Skaftá
Skeiðará
Skógá 
Sog
Þjórsá (the longest river in Iceland, 230 km)
Tungnaá

West
Fossá
Hvítá 
Kjarrá–Thervá
Norðurá

Westfjords
Dynjandi
Kolbeinsá
Staðará

North
Blanda
Eyjafjarðará 
Eystri Jökulsá 
Fnjóská 
Glerá
Héraðsvötn
Hörgá 
Jökulsá á Fjöllum
Laxá 
Norðurá 
Skjálfandafljót
Vatnsdalsá

East

Hamarsá 
Hofsá
Jökulsá á Dal
Jökulsá í Fljótsdal 
Jökulsá í Lóni 
Lagarfljót 
Selfljót

See also

 
Iceland
Rivers